Macrohasseltia is a  monotypic genus of flowering plants in the family Salicaceae. It consists of one species of tree: Macrohasseltia macroterantha, which is native to Central America. Formerly placed in the heterogeneous family Flacourtiaceae, Macrohasseltia is now classified in Salicaceae, along with close relatives Bennettiodendron, Carrierea, Idesia, Itoa, Olmediella, Poliothyrsis, and even the willows (Salix) and cottonwoods (Populus) themselves.

References

Monotypic Malpighiales genera
Salicaceae
Salicaceae genera
Flora of Central America